Wellington Tornadoes is a not-for-profit association football academy for players based in Wellington, New Zealand.

History
Wellington Tornadoes was founded in 2008 by Guy Smith to provide academy training for aspiring football players aged 12–16.

Each yearly intake remains with the academy for eight months, culminating in a tour of United States of America in January to compete in a number of youth tournaments.
While tours vary from year to year, they typically include an introduction of the US College system, discussions with College coaches, and current and former New Zealand college players.

Coaching staff
Head Coach: Guy Smith
Assistant Coach: Patrick Fleming
Goalkeeping Coach: Dale Warburton
Physiotherapist: Paul Steele

2012/13 Intake

Squad
As of 1 July 2012.

Friendlies

2011/12 Intake

Squad
As of 1 July 2011.

Fixtures

Friendlies

2011 McCartney Invitation Tournament

2011 Disney's Soccer Showcase

2012 Vegas Cup

References

External links

Association football academies
Torn
2008 establishments in New Zealand